Yekimovskaya is a rural locality (a village) in Kharovskoye Rural Settlement, Kharovsky District, Vologda Oblast, Russia. The population was 3 as of 2002.

Geography 
Yekimovskaya is located 16 km northwest of Kharovsk (the district's administrative centre) by road. Panovskoye is the nearest rural locality.

References 

Rural localities in Kharovsky District